Yanah Gerber (born 16 March 2001) is a South African water polo player. She competed in the 2020 Summer Olympics.

References

2001 births
Living people
Water polo players at the 2020 Summer Olympics
South African female water polo players
Olympic water polo players of South Africa
21st-century South African women